Vodudahue Airport ,  is an airstrip  northeast of Chaitén, a town in the Los Lagos Region of Chile. The valley extends eastward into Pumalín Park.

There is nearby mountainous terrain north and south of the airstrip, and distant mountainous terrain to the east. The west quadrant opens into the fjord.

See also

Transport in Chile
List of airports in Chile

References

External links
OpenStreetMap - Vodudahue
OurAirports - Vodudahue
SkyVector - Vodudahue
FallingRain - Vodudahue Airport

Airports in Chile
Airports in Los Lagos Region